Eileen Buggy is an Irish make-up artist and hairstylist who has worked in the film industry since 1993. In addition to being nominated for several other Irish Film & Television Academy Awards (IFTAs), she received awards in the Makeup & Hair category for Ripper Street at the 10th IFTAs and for The Green Knight at the 18th IFTAs.

Career
Buggy has worked with actors such as Anne Hathaway and Martin Sheen; Sheen "personally thanked her for giving him a perm" in Thaddeus O'Sullivan's 2011 film Stella Days.

In 2009, Buggy received a nomination for an Irish Film & Television Award, in the Make-up & Hair category, on George Gently. She also received a nomination for the same award in 2010 for Zonad, and a nomination in 2012 for Stella Days. In 2012, she received an Oscar nomination for the 2011 period drama film Albert Nobbs. At the 2013 British Academy Television Craft Awards, she received a nomination in the Best Make-Up & Hair Design category for her work on Ripper Street. In 2020, at the 16th Irish Film & Television Awards, Buggy received a nomination for her work on Vita & Virginia. In 2022, she won the Makeup & Hair category at the 18th IFTA awards for The Green Knight.

Personal life
Eileen Buggy is the sister of actor Niall Buggy. As of 2013 she was living in Drumcondra, Dublin. She is married with four children.

Filmography

Film

Television

References

External links 

Living people
Irish film people
British film people
Irish television people
British television people
Irish actresses
Year of birth missing (living people)